Salah Elmur also spelled Salah El Mur (Arabic: صلاح المر, born 1966, Khartoum, Sudan) is a contemporary Sudanese painter, graphic designer, author, and filmmaker, who lives and works in Khartoum.

Life and artistic career 
Elmur's painting style can be defined as abstract, but not to the point of incomprehensibility. He favors bold tones in thick paint strokes complemented with occasional shades of lighter hues. "The colours in my paintings are very strong because of the sun in my country and also because of the people there, who love to wear colourful clothes," says Salah Elmur. The subjects express unreserved emotional capacities; although the paintings do not include significant events or action, each face appears to have a story behind it.

Elmur is a painter, filmmaker, photographer, illustrator, and author of several children's books. Museum of African Contemporary Art Al Maaden (MACAAL), The Sharjah Art Museum and the Sharjah Art Foundation (SAF). His paintings have been exhibited in Egypt, the UAE, Sudan, Syria, Jordan, France, Washington D.C., Uganda, and Kenya among other locations. His work has even been shown in a group exhibition at the British Museum in London, a rare honor for a contemporary artist from Sudan.

In 2013, Elmur's exhibition "Eyes Stream" drew inspiration from the name of an ancient wall in Cairo, "Wall of Hungarian Eyes." He meditated on the label, and decided to explore the human eye in a recent series of paintings.
His 2011 series called "Circus" features strong colours, as well as Elmur's distinctive figurative, yet abstract style. There is the brown horse with the bright-orange roller skates under his hooves or the man with his tongue sticking out, ready to bite into a ripe slice of watermelon – a reference to the people who came to the circus with their picnics, when he was a child growing up in Sudan.

Fruits are a preferred subject of Elmur. They can be found again and again in his paintings, just like people and animals. His latest works from 2006 featured insects, fruits and people, as well as a series from 2007 entitled "Guards". Time and again, it is the bird in various forms and colours that he depicts in those paintings -‐ sitting on the head of a person or on an arm, rocking on a rope or flying high above the other images.

The exhibition at the residence of the European Commission in Cairo, organised and arranged by Stefania Angarano from Mashrabia Gallery in Cairo was Elmur's third exhibition in the Egyptian capital. After closing its doors at the end of May, a collection of the paintings traveled to Washington, DC, where they were shown at the African Cultural Centre for a month.

Using traditional elements in a contemporary way is what distinguishes Elmur's style. "His paintings are full of symbols and rituals, but it is never clear what they really are – that makes them very mysterious and attractive."

In February 2018, an exhibition inspired by the childhood and early life of Elmur, called ‘Fragrances of the Forest and Photos’ presenting more than 70 artworks was on show at the Sharjah Art Museum, United Arab Emirates. Here, Elmur's paintings lead the viewer through a personal voyage of discovery, showing some of his experiences of growing up in Khartoum. The works showed his exploration of the city's streets and the surrounding countryside as a child.

In September 2018, Elmur took part in a group show with Kamala Ishaq and Ibrahim El-Salahi at Saatchi Gallery in London, entitled 'Forests and Spirits: Figurative art from the Khartoum School'''. This exhibition intended to bring wider attention to contemporary African art, and in particular the influence of the Khartoum School, an art movement originating from the city's College of Fine and Applied Arts.

As a filmmaker, Elmur has directed and produced six short films, stylistically situated between documentary and fantasy film. He won the Jury Prize (special acknowledgement) for his film "Heaven's Bird" at the International Short Film festival "Images that matter" in Ethiopia in 2010.

Elmur also has been active as composer and illustrator of children's books, published in Arabic, French, Italian, and Spanish by Grandir Publishing and Syros. In particular, he has published the following titles in French: “ Chacodile” (Grandir, 2002), "Jameil et Jamila: Conte Baggara du Soudan" text by Patricia Musa (Grandir, 2003), "Diakhere, la Cadette: Contes de Mauritanie" text by Mamadou Sall (Lirabelle, 2006), “Sous Le Soleil” text by Badr Eddine Arodaky (Syros, 2007), “Une Famille d’Artiste” (Grandir, 2007), “Le Soudan” with Patricia Musa (Grandir, 2010), and “A Qui est cet Oeuf?” with Camille Pilet (Grandir, 2013).

 Major exhibitions 

 Salah Elmur Fragrances of the Forest and Photos, Sharjah Art Museum, United Arab Emirates, 28 February-2 June 2018
 Forests and Spirits: figurative art from the Khartoum School.'' SALON at Saatchi Gallery, London, UK, 28 September - 25 November 2018.

See also 

 Visual arts of Sudan
Cinema of Sudan

References

Further reading 

 Art of the Sudan: the convergence of two great traditions webpage by Sotheby's with paintings by Elmur and other Sudanese painters

Living people
Year of birth missing (living people)
20th-century Sudanese painters
Sudanese painters
Sudanese artists
Sudanese graphic designers
Sudanese screenwriters
Sudanese film directors
Sudanese film producers
Sudanese male writers